Nuthall is a surname. Notable people with the surname include:

Betty Nuthall (1911–1983), English tennis player
Matthew Nuthall (born 1983), Welsh rugby union player
Thomas Nuthall (died 1775), English politician and lawyer

See also
Nuttall (name)